Fibular aplasia-ectrodactyly syndrome is a very rare genetic disorder which is characterized by aplasia/hypoplasia of the fibula, ectrodactyly, and/or brachydactyly/syndactyly. Additional symptoms include shortness of the femur and tibial/knee/hip/ankle defects. This disorder is inherited in an autosomal dominant manner.

Etiology 

This disorder was first described in 2002 by Evans et al.. It was discovered that this disorder seems to have a male preference in sporadic cases, but tends to have an equal male-female preference in familial cases. Offspring have a higher chance of being born with the disorder if the mother carries the gene or is affected herself.

This disorder is very rare, since only 60 cases have been recorded in medical literature.

References 

Rare genetic syndromes
Autosomal dominant disorders